Paul Hoffmann may refer to:

 Paul Hoffmann (cricketer) (born 1970), Australian cricketer
 Paul Hoffmann (naval officer) (1846–1917), officer of the Imperial German Navy
 Paul Hoffmann (neurophysiologist) (1884–1962), German neurophysiologist known for describing Hoffmann's sign
 Paul Hoffmann (actor) (1902–1990), German actor
 Paul Hoffmann (American football), American football coach

See also 
 Paul Hoffman (disambiguation)